The EURion constellation (also known as Omron rings or doughnuts) is a pattern of symbols incorporated into a number of secure documents such as banknotes and ownership title certificates designs worldwide since about 1996.  It is added to help imaging software detect the presence of such a document in a digital image.  Such software can then block the user from reproducing banknotes to prevent counterfeiting using colour photocopiers.

Description 

The name "EURion constellation" was coined by security researcher Markus Kuhn, who uncovered the pattern on the 10 Euro (€10) banknote in early 2002 while experimenting with a Xerox colour photocopier that refused to reproduce banknotes. The pattern has never been mentioned officially; Kuhn named it the EURion constellation as it resembled the astronomical Orion constellation, and EUR is the ISO 4217 designation of the euro currency.

The EURion constellation first described by Kuhn consists of a pattern of five small yellow, green or orange circles, which is repeated across areas of the banknote at different orientations. The mere presence of five of these circles on a page is sufficient for some colour photocopiers to refuse processing.

Some banks integrate the constellation tightly with the remaining design of the note. On 50 DM German banknotes, the EURion circles formed the innermost circles in a background pattern of fine concentric circles. On the front of former Bank of England Elgar £20 notes, they appear as green heads of musical notes; however, on the Smith £20 notes of 2007 the circles merely cluster around the "£20" text. On some U.S. bills, they appear as the digit zero in small, yellow numbers matching the value of the note. On Japanese yen, these circles sometimes appear as flowers.

Technical details regarding the EURion constellation are kept secret by its inventors and users. A 1995 patent application suggests that the pattern and detection algorithm were designed at Omron Corporation, a Japanese electronics company. It is also not clear whether the feature has any official name. The term "Omron anti-photocopying feature" appeared in an August 2005 press release by the Reserve Bank of India. In 2007 the term "Omron rings" was used in an award announcement by a banknote collectors society.

Usage 
The following table lists the banknotes on which the EURion constellation or Omron rings have been found so far. Current currencies for which all recent banknotes use the constellation are in bold.

Other banknote detection mechanisms

Counterfeit Deterrence System 

Since 2003, image editors such as Adobe Photoshop CS or Paint Shop Pro 8 refuse to print banknotes. According to Wired.com, the banknote detection code in these applications, called the Counterfeit Deterrence System (CDS), was designed by the Central Bank Counterfeit Deterrence Group and supplied to companies such as Adobe as a binary module. Experiments by Steven J. Murdoch and others showed that this banknote detection code does not rely on the EURion pattern. It instead detects a digital watermark embedded in the images, developed by Digimarc.

See also 
 Printer steganography, used by some colour laser printers to add hidden encoded information to printouts
 Coded anti-piracy, an anti–copyright-infringement technology which marks each film print of a motion picture with distinguishing patterns of dots, used as a forensic identifier to identify the source of illegal copies
 3D printed firearm

Notes 
  Some currencies (marked [€]) were replaced by the euro before the complete adoption of the EURion constellation.

References

Further reading

External links 
 The rules for currency image use- website of the Central Bank Counterfeit Deterrence Group (CBCDG)
 Nieves, J.; Ruiz-Agundez, I. & Bringas, P. (2010), 'Recognizing Banknote Patterns for Protecting Economic Transactions''Database and Expert Systems Applications (DEXA), 2010 Workshop on', IEEE, 247—249.
 Data Genetics, Anti Counterfeit Measures 

Money forgery
Currency production
Banknotes
Watermarking
Hardware restrictions
Computer-related introductions in 1996
2002 neologisms